The men's 800 metres was an event at the 1980 Summer Olympics in Moscow, Soviet Union. There were a total number of 41 participating athletes from 28 nations, with six qualifying heats, three semifinals, and the final held on Saturday July 26, 1980. The maximum number of athletes per nation had been set at 3 since the 1930 Olympic Congress. The event was won by Steve Ovett of Great Britain, the nation's first gold medal in the men's 800 metres since winning four in a row from 1920 to 1932. It was Great Britain's sixth overall title in the event.

Background

This was the 19th appearance of the event, which is one of 12 athletics events to have been held at every Summer Olympics. None of the 1976 medalists returned, but three finalists did: fifth-place finisher Steve Ovett of Great Britain, seventh-place finisher Sriram Singh of India, and eight-place finisher Carlo Grippo of Italy. Ovett and his countryman Sebastian Coe were the favorites; Coe held the world record, though Ovett had beaten him at the 1978 European Championships (both behind Olaf Beyer of East Germany, also a challenger in Moscow). The United States-led boycott kept out world number one Don Paige.

Benin, Botswana, Bulgaria, Guinea, Kuwait, Laos, Lesotho, Libya, Sierra Leone, and Syria appeared in the event for the first time. Great Britain made its 18th appearance, most among all nations, having had no competitors in the event only in the 1904 Games in St. Louis.

Competition format

The competition used the three-round format that had been in use for most Games since 1912. The "fastest loser" system introduced in 1964 was used for both the first round and semifinals. There were six first-round heats, each with 6 or 7 athletes; the top three runners in each heat as well as the next six fastest overall advanced to the semifinals. There were two semifinals with 8 athletes each; the top two runners in each semifinal as well as the next two fastest overall advanced to the eight-man final.

Records

Prior to the competition, the existing World and Olympic records were as follows.

No world or Olympic records were set during the competition.

Schedule

All times are Moscow Time (UTC+3)

Results

Round 1

The first round was held on Thursday, 24 July 1980.

Heat 1

Heat 2

Heat 3

Heat 4

Heat 5

Heat 6

Semifinals

The semifinals were held on Friday, 25 July 1980.

Semifinal 1

Semifinal 2

Semifinal 3

Final

This Olympic 800-metre final was a notably tactical one.  Already on the first back straight, there was some physical contact in the tightly bunched eight-man field.  Britain's Steve Ovett was boxed in and pushed East Germany's Detlef Wagenknecht, in order to get more room and a tactically better place.  The first 200 metres were run in about 26 seconds, according to the long-time BBC sports journalist David Coleman.  At that point, Brazil's Agberto Guimaraes was leading the race, flanked by Britain's David Warren.  On the first home straight, Ovett again tried to force his way to a better position, elbowing Wagenknecht and the Soviet Union's Nikolay Kirov.  Unofficially the 400-metre split time was 54.55 seconds.  Behind Guimaraes, Warren and Wagenknecht, Kirov and East Germany's Andreas Busse were tied for the fourth place.  Ovett and France's José Marajo ran right behind Busse.  The strongest pre-race favourite, and the sole world record holder at 800 metres, 1000 metres and the mile, Britain's Sebastian Coe, was running eighth, and almost touched the third lane's edge.  At or around 430 or 440 metres, Warren suddenly sprinted past Guimaraes.  Kirov rose to the second place, and on the final back straight, Ovett moved to the third place.  With over 200 metres to run, Kirov kicked into the lead, followed closely by Ovett.  Only at this point, Coe began to sprint hard, moving quickly into the fifth place.  On the final bend, Kirov and Ovett were able to maintain their lead over Guimaraes and Coe.  In the final straight's first half, Ovett easily passed Kirov while Coe desperately accelerated towards Guimaraes.  While he managed to pass the Brazilian, Coe lost valuable time and energy, and he was only able to catch one more runner, Kirov, in the final straight's second half.  At the finish line, Ovett was still some three-and-a-half metres ahead of Coe, who finished a disappointed second, just half a metre ahead of the fading Kirov.  (See YouTube videos of the 800-metre final;  Kenny Moore, Best Efforts;  Pat Roberts, The Perfect Distance:  Coe and Ovett - The Record-Breaking Rivalry;  Juoksija-lehti (The Runner Magazine), Moskovan olympiakirja (The Moscow Olympic Book).)

See also
 1978 Men's European Championships 800 metres (Prague)
 1982 Men's European Championships 800 metres (Athens)
 1983 Men's World Championships 800 metres (Helsinki)
 1984 Men's Olympic Games 800 metres (Los Angeles)
 1986 Men's European Championships 800 metres (Stuttgart)

References

External links
 Results

M
800 metres at the Olympics
Men's events at the 1980 Summer Olympics